Timon Theuer (born 5 March 1994) is an Austrian long-distance runner. In 2020, he competed in the men's race at the 2020 World Athletics Half Marathon Championships held in Gdynia, Poland.

References

External links 
 

Living people
1994 births
Place of birth missing (living people)
Austrian male long-distance runners